Like Me is a 2017 American film written and directed by Robert Mockler. The film stars Addison Timlin as a loner on a crime spree that she broadcasts on social media. The film had its world premiere at the South by Southwest Film Festival on March 10, 2017. It holds a 69% approval rating on review aggregator website Rotten Tomatoes based on 29 reviews, with an average rating of 6.6/10.

Cast
 Addison Timlin as Kiya 
 Ian Nelson as Burt 
 Larry Fessenden as Marshall 
 Jeremy Gardner as Freddie 
 Nicolette Pierini as Julia
 Ana Asensio as Anna
 Shawn C. Phillips as a Reactor

References

External links
 
 

2017 films
2017 independent films
American independent films
American drama films
2010s English-language films
2010s American films
Films about social media